Palmyra Township is a township in Douglas County, Kansas, USA. As of the 2000 census, its population was 5,760. It was named after a small trail stop on the Santa Fe Trail that was later absorbed into Baldwin City.  When it was first established in 1855, it was called Calhoun, until 1858.

Geography
According to the USGS, it contains six cemeteries: Baldwin City, Brumbaugh, Oakwood, Old Black Jack, Prairie City and Vinland.

The stream of Wymore Creek runs through this township.

Adjacent townships
Wakarusa Township, Douglas County (northwest)
Eudora Township, Douglas County (northeast)
McCamish Township, Johnson County (east)
Richland Township, Miami County (southeast)
Franklin Township, Franklin County (south)
Hayes Township, Franklin County (southwest)
Willow Springs Township, Douglas County (west)

Towns and settlements
Although these towns may not be incorporated or populated, they are still placed on maps produced by the county.

Baldwin City, located at 
Black Jack, located at 
Brooklyn, located at 
Clearfield, located at 
Prairie City, located at 
Vinland, located at

Transportation

Major highways
U.S. Highway 56
K-33

Airports
Palmyra Township contains one airport or landing strip, Vinland Valley Aerodrome.

Places of interest

Douglas State Fishing Lake northeast of Baldwin City has fishing, hunting and limited camping.
Signal Oak, a hill north of Baldwin where a tall oak tree once stood that was used to warn Lawrence about approaching guerrilla attacks during the American Civil War. The tree is gone but is clearly marked and has a scenic view of the Coal Creek, Wakarusa and Kaw Valleys.
Spring Lake, a small fishing and recreation lake southeast of Baldwin offer scenic views, fishing and hiking trails.
Ivan Boyd Prairie Preserve and Robert Pearson Memorial Park, located east of Baldwin marks wagon ruts along the Santa Fe Trail and the Battle of Black Jack which some consider the first battle of the Civil War.

References

Sources

External links
 US-Counties.com
 City-Data.com

Townships in Douglas County, Kansas
Townships in Kansas